Stepan Petrovich Akelkin (born 9 October 1985) is a former Russian professional football player.

Club career
He played two seasons in the Russian Football National League for FC Fakel Voronezh and FC Dynamo Bryansk.

External links
 
 

1985 births
People from Altai Krai
Living people
Russian footballers
Association football midfielders
FC Zenit Saint Petersburg players
FC Rotor Volgograd players
FC Fakel Voronezh players
FC Dynamo Saint Petersburg players
FC Dynamo Bryansk players
FC Zhemchuzhina Sochi players
FC Baikal Irkutsk players
FC Amur Blagoveshchensk players
Sportspeople from Altai Krai